Velicham is a 1987 Indian Tamil-language film, directed by Sundar K. Vijayan, starring Karthik and Ranjini .

Cast
Karthik as Ashok Kumar
Ranjini
Nizhalgal Ravi
Vinu Chakravarthy
Senthil
Kovai Sarala
Sumithra
Thyagu
Chinni Jayanth
Kumarimuthu
 Vijay Ganesh as Student

References

1980 films
1987 films
1980s Tamil-language films
Films directed by K. Vijayan
Films scored by Manoj–Gyan